Stranvaesia amphidoxa is a species of flowering plant in the family Rosaceae.

References

amphidoxa